Bithynia majorcina is a species of small freshwater snail with an operculum, an aquatic gastropod mollusc in the family Bithyniidae.

Description
Shell yellowish horn-coloured, glossy, with 5.5 whorls, suture shallow, aperture oval rounded at the top, umbilicus slit like. Shell height 7.6-9.5 mm, width 4.9-6.0 mm.

Distribution
The species is only known from Majorca where it lives on calcareous bottom of consolidate sediments with stones in the Torrent (Mountain stream) Son Jordi, which is the locus typicus, and in the Torrent de Sóller.

References

Bithyniidae
Fauna of Mallorca
Endemic fauna of the Balearic Islands
Gastropods described in 2007